Zinc finger protein 773 is a protein that in humans is encoded by the ZNF773 gene.

References

Further reading 

Human proteins